Janta Market is a historic booth market located in the city of Mohali, Punjab State, western India. It is situated in Phase-3B1 and is also known as Rerhi Market. It contains shops selling clothing, footwear, beauty products and other general goods and services.

Fire incident and aftermath
On the morning of 1 June 2007, a fire broke out in the market. All the booths were burned with extensive damage. It is believed that the fire was arson. However, this was never proved.

References

Mohali
Retail markets in India
Buildings and structures in Mohali